Buys is a Dutch surname. It may refer to:

C. H. D. Buys Ballot, (1817-1890) Dutch chemist 
Frieke Buys, Dutch swimmer 
Izak Buys, Dutch cricket player
Jacobus Buys, (1724-1801) Dutch painter 
Jenna-Anne Buys, South African figure skater 
Willem Buys, (1661-1749) Dutch civil official 

Dutch-language surnames
Afrikaans-language surnames
Surnames of Dutch origin